Charaundi is a small commercial zone but with great importance for whole Dhusha Village Development Committee situated along the Prithvi Highway in Dhading District in the Bagmati Zone of central Nepal. At the time of the 1991 Nepal census it had a population of 6264 and had 1196 houses in it.

References

Populated places in Dhading District

pl:Charaundi